The 1908 Kendall Orange and Black football team represented Henry Kendall College (later renamed the University of Tulsa) during the 1908 college football season. This was the first season that the institution was located in Tulsa, Oklahoma. In its first season under head coach Sam P. McBirney, the team compiled a 2–3 record and outscored its opponents by a total of 80 to 43.  The team played no intercollegiate football games.  Four of its games were played against local high schools, and the fifth was against the Outrigger Canoe Club from Pawhuska, Oklahoma.

Schedule

References

Kendall
Tulsa Golden Hurricane football seasons
Kendall Orange and Black football